Aaron Tucker (born 1982) is a Canadian digital artist, writer, and educator.

He is a lecturer in the English department and a research fellow with the Centre for Digital Humanities at Toronto Metropolitan University.

Life and work 
Tucker was born in Vernon, British Columbia, and resides and works in Toronto, Ontario. He is the author of two books of poetry and two academic books.
He teaches and researches 3D printing and other artistic ways of rethinking the relationship between humans and computers. He also collaborates with poets, programmers, and artists on digital art projects such as The ChessBard and Loss Sets.

Works

Academic books 
Interfacing With the Internet in Popular Cinema. New York: Palgrave Macmillan, 2014.
Virtual Weaponry: The Militarized Internet in Hollywood War Films. New York: Palgrave Macmillan, 2017.
Write Here, Right Now: An Interactive Introduction to Academic Writing and Research. Toronto: Ryerson University Pressbooks, 2018. With Dr. Paul Chafe.

Poetry books 
Punchlines. Toronto: Mansfield Press, 2014.
Irresponsible Mediums: The Chess Games of Marcel Duchamp. Toronto: BookThug, 2017.

Art projects 
The ChessBard with Jody Miller. Toronto: various locations, 2014-. 
Loss Sets with Jordan Scott, Namir Ahmed, and Tiffany Cheung. Toronto, Ryerson University Digital Media Experience Lab, 2015-.

Art exhibitions and performances 
You/I: Interfaces & Reader Experience. Paul Watkins Gallery, Winona State University, Winona, MN, USA. September 22-October 14, 2016. Curated by Dene Grigar.
The ChessBard at Philalalia with Jennifer Shahade. Philalalia. Temple University, Philadelphia, PA, USA. September 15, 2016.
Electronic Literature Festival 2016. University of Victoria, Victoria, B.C., Canada. June 2016. Curated by Brenda Grell.
Jennifer Shahade & The ChessBard: A Blindfold Exhibition. Ryerson University, Toronto, Ontario, Canada. September 15, 2015.
The ChessBard Aaron Tucker and Jody Miller. The Ends of Electronic Literature Festival Exhibition. University of Bergen, Bergen, Norway. August 2015.

References

External links 

Living people
1982 births
People from Vernon, British Columbia
University of Windsor alumni
University of Victoria alumni
Toronto Metropolitan University people
Canadian digital artists
21st-century Canadian poets